The 1990 Australian motorcycle Grand Prix was the last round of the 1990 Grand Prix motorcycle racing season. It took place on the weekend of 14–16 September 1990 at Phillip Island.

500 cc race report 
Cagiva sat out the last race, as the grid was headed by Mick Doohan, Kevin Schwantz, Wayne Gardner and Eddie Lawson. The start went to the Rothmans Hondas, but by the hairpin Wayne Rainey was up to third. Exiting the hairpin, Gardner almost highsided, letting Rainey through.

Rainey took the lead from Doohan, with Gardner making it a trio away at the front. Rainey was passed by Doohan on the straight, but he re-took the lead by barging through the inside of the hairpin. Doohan passed on the straight again: the Yamaha was never beaten on straight-line speed. The trio became a quartet as Schwantz caught up, having set the fastest lap of the race.

Gardner's fairing came loose after his near-crash, but he managed to pass Rainey on the straight to take second spot, and again Rainey inelegantly pushed Gardner wide on the hairpin apex, which allowed Schwantz into third. With 7 laps to go, Doohan was out front down the straight, Schwantz in second and Gardner back into third as he passed Rainey into Turn One. He then passed Schwantz before the hairpin.

Gardner passed Doohan in Turn One, causing Doohan to nearly highside through the right-hander as Schwantz closed the gap that had been forming and then goes on to pass him. Rainey was still in fourth place. On the brakes into Turn One, Schwantz had a high-speed highside and crashed out of second. Gardner won the race in front of Doohan, with a small gap to Rainey in third.

500 cc classification

References

Australian motorcycle Grand Prix
Australian
Motorcycle
Motorsport at Phillip Island
September 1990 sports events in Australia